Tyler Jordan Marz (born September 9, 1992) is an American football offensive tackle who is a free agent. He played college football at Wisconsin.

Professional career

Tennessee Titans
Marz was signed by the Tennessee Titans as an undrafted free agent on May 9, 2016. He was released during final roster cuts on September 2, 2016, and was signed to the Titans' practice squad the next day. He signed a reserve/future contract with the Titans on January 2, 2017.

On September 2, 2017, Marz was waived by the Titans and was signed to the practice squad the next day.

Los Angeles Chargers
On September 20, 2017, Marz was signed by the Los Angeles Chargers off the Titans' practice squad. He was waived by the Chargers on November 7, 2017.

Tennessee Titans (second stint)
On November 9, 2017, Marz was signed to the Titans' practice squad. He signed a reserve/future contract with the Titans on January 15, 2018.

On September 1, 2018, Marz was waived by the Titans and was signed to the practice squad the next day. He was promoted to the active roster on September 15, 2018. On September 16, 2018, Marz made his first career start against the Houston Texans in Week 2.

On August 31, 2019, Marz was waived by the Titans.

Carolina Panthers
On December 18, 2019, Marz was signed to the Carolina Panthers practice squad. He signed a reserve/future contract with the Panthers on December 30, 2019. He was waived on August 1, 2020.

Miami Dolphins
On July 28, 2021, Marz signed with the Miami Dolphins. He was waived on August 17.

References

1992 births
Living people
Players of American football from Minnesota
People from Springfield, Minnesota
American football offensive tackles
Wisconsin Badgers football players
Tennessee Titans players
Los Angeles Chargers players
Carolina Panthers players
Miami Dolphins players